Karsten Neitzel (born 17 December 1967) is a former German football player and former manager. He has served as position assistant coach for Head Coach Michael Feichtenbeiner of Malaysia Super League club Selangor.

Managerial career

VfL Bochum 
On 8 April 2013, Neitzel was sacked as the manager of VfL Bochum.

Selangor F.C.
In 16 November 2020, he was appointed as the manager of Malaysia Super League club Selangor F.C.

In 21 November 2021, he was appointed as assistant coach for Head Coach Michael Feichtenbeiner of Malaysia Super League club Selangor F.C.

Career statistics

Managerial statistics

References

External links

1967 births
Living people
Footballers from Dresden
German footballers
East German footballers
Association football defenders
DDR-Oberliga players
Bundesliga players
2. Bundesliga players
Dynamo Dresden players
Dynamo Dresden II players
Hallescher FC players
Stuttgarter Kickers players
SC Freiburg players
German football managers
2. Bundesliga managers
3. Liga managers
VfL Bochum managers
Holstein Kiel managers
SV Elversberg managers
German expatriate football managers
German expatriate sportspeople in Malaysia
People from Bezirk Dresden
German expatriate sportspeople in Japan